Christian Ledesma (born February 4, 1976 in Mar del Plata, Buenos Aires Province) is an Argentine racing driver. He has run in different series, with major success in Turismo Carretera (2007 champion) and TC2000/STC2000 (2004 champion).

Career

Junior series
From 1987 to 1994, he took part of more than 100 races, being three times champion and four times vice-champion (Junior Category, Senior Category and Sudam Senior Series) and driving for his brother Jhonny Ledesma's team.

Formula Honda
He took part of 1994 Drivers' National Contest, Prodriver. He was the winner of the first contest among 40 participants and got the right of driving for Formula Honda's Prodriver team, managed by Guillermo Kissling.

He won the 1995 Argentine Champhionship by mid-season; he got 6 pole positions, 6 wins and 10 podiums in 10 races.

South American Formula 3
He took part of the 1996 championship becoming the best rookie of the season, at the wheel of a Tom's Toyota of Víctor Rosso's ProRacing team. He got a third place at Goiânia, Brazil, and finished 10th overall in the championship.

Formula Super Renault
He got the 1997 Argentine Formula Super Renault title driving a Reynard/Renault of Guillermo and Raúl Kissling's team - four wins, and eight podiums overall.

Formula 3000
He tested for F3000's Team Draco at Magione, Italy. He managed to score 1:06.500 - 0.3 seconds away from the fastest driver of the test's time.

Touring car series

His debut in TC 2000 was in the second race of 2003 season. That first year he got two wins, Bahía Blanca and Río Cuarto, and one third place at Mar del Plata.

He crowned himself as 2004 champion, with four wins overall. It was the first time Chevrolet got a championship inside TC2000 series.

Ledesma fought the 2006 to 2008 championships, resulting 5th, 3rd and 4th respectively. After a poor 2009, he was 9th in 2010. In 2011 he continues racing for Chevrolet, now with a Chevrolet Cruze. He competed on the Chevrolet Argentina factory team until 2012. Then he went through others in the category until 2016, his final year in the championship.

In Turismo Carretera (TC), he started driving a Ford (1998–2000). As of 2001, he has been driving a Chevrolet.

He clinched the 2007 championship, with six wins and 294.5 points overall. In addition to that, he broke Juan María Traverso's 1995 pointscoring record (five wins and 272 points). He was runner-up in 2014 and has won more than 20 races in his TC career.

He also competed in Turismo Nacional, Top Race V6 and TC Pick Up.

See also
 Office site 
 Driver profile (HistoricRacing.com) 

1976 births
Sportspeople from Mar del Plata
Turismo Carretera drivers
TC 2000 Championship drivers
Argentine racing drivers
Top Race V6 drivers
FIA GT Championship drivers
Living people
Súper TC 2000 drivers